The Burmese hare (Lepus peguensis) is a species of mammal in the family Leporidae. It is found in Cambodia, Laos, Myanmar, Thailand, and Vietnam.

Subspecies
Three subspecies are recognised; L. p. peguensis, L. p. siamensis and L. p. vassali.

Description
The long ears have black tips, the dorsal surface of the body is reddish-grey tinged with black, the rump is rather greyer and the underparts are white. The tail is white above and black below and the feet are white in individuals from Burma and reddish-brown or yellowish-brown in those from Thailand.

Distribution and habitat
The range of the Burmese hare extends from southern Myanmar, south of the Chindwin River, to northern parts of the Malay Peninsula, including Thailand, Cambodia, southern Laos and southern Vietnam. Its typical habitats are cropland and dry wasteland, clearings in forests and coastal sandy areas. It is common in seasonally-inundated riverside flats, and is present in rice fields cultivated in a traditional manner while avoiding heavily irrigated, intensively-grown paddies.

Biology
The Burmese hare is nocturnal and feeds on grass, twigs and bark. Several litters of young, averaging three or four, are borne in a year after a gestation period of about thirty-seven days. The average lifespan is estimated to be six years.

Status
Threats faced by the Burmese hare include the increased cultivation of irrigated rice paddies, which results in unsuitable habitat, and being hunted for food. However the hare has a wide range and is a common animal. The population is stable, or even possibly increasing in places where logging results in favourable scrubby habitat, so the International Union for Conservation of Nature lists its conservation status as being of "least concern".

References

Lepus
Mammals described in 1855
Taxa named by Edward Blyth
Taxonomy articles created by Polbot